Polymastiidae is a family of demosponges found in oceans throughout the world. It is the only family in the monotypic order Polymastiida. A useful diagnostic characteristic of members of this family is the presence of numerous surface papillae although this feature is shown by some other sponges.

Genera
The following genera are recognised in the family Polymastiidae
 Acanthopolymastia
 Astrotylus
 Atergia
 Koltunia
 Polymastia
 Proteleia
 Pseudotrachya
 Quasillina
 Radiella
 Ridleia
 Sphaerotylus
 Spinularia
 Tentorium
 Trachyteleia
 Tylexocladus
 Weberella

References
North East Atlantic Taxa

WoRMS - Polymastiidae Gray, 1867